The Catholic Charismatic Renewal is a movement within the Catholic Church that is part of the wider charismatic movement across historic Christian churches. 

The Renewal has been described as a "current of grace". It began in 1967 when Catholics from Duquesne University attended a Protestant worship service and claimed to have been "baptized in the Holy Spirit". It is heavily influenced by American Protestantism, especially Pentecostalism, with an emphasis on having a "personal relationship with Jesus", deep emotional experiences, and expressing the "gifts of the Holy Spirit".

Cardinal Leo Jozef Suenens described charismatic renewal as: "not a specific Movement; the Renewal is not a Movement in the common sociological sense; it does not have founders, it is not homogeneous and it includes a great variety of realities; it is a current of grace, a renewing breath of the Spirit for all members of the Church, laity, religious, priests and bishops. It is a challenge for us all. One does not form part of the Renewal, rather, the Renewal becomes a part of us provided that we accept the grace it offers us” According to Fr. Raniero Cantalamessa, "He [Jesus Christ] is no longer just a set of theses and dogmas.... no longer just an object of worship and of remembrance but a living reality in the Spirit".

Catholics who practice charismatic worship usually hold prayer meetings outside of Mass that feature prophecy,  faith healing, and glossolalia. In Ann Arbor, Michigan, a Catholic church describes charismatic worship as "uplifted hands during songs and audible praying in tongues."

According to theologians Peter Hocken, Tony Richie and Christopher Stephenson, the Catholic charismatic renewal is intrinsically ecumenical and has given rise to covenant communities with members from major Christian denominations who lead a "shared life based on baptism in the Holy Spirit".

Perceptions of the charismatic movement vary within the Catholic Church, although it has been favourably regarded by the last four Popes.
 Proponents hold the belief that certain charismata (a Greek word for "gifts") are still bestowed by the Holy Spirit today as they were in Early Christianity as described in the Bible. Critics accuse charismatic Catholics of misinterpreting, or in some cases violating, Church teachings on worship and liturgy. Traditional Catholics, in particular, argue that charismatic practices shift the focus of worship away from reverent communion with Christ in the Eucharist and towards individual emotions and non-liturgical experiences as a substitute. Other Catholics say that their involvement with charismatic renewal has revitalised their faith and led them to a deeper devotion to Christ in the Eucharist and a fuller appreciation of the liturgy.

Theological foundations

Other references to charisms in the Catechism of the Catholic Church include §§688, 768, 799–801, 890, 951, 1508 (charism of healing) and 2035. The belief that spiritual gifts exist in the present age is called Continuationism.

History

Origins

In search of a spiritual experience, the graduate student Ralph Keifer and history professor William Storey, both of the Catholic Duquesne University in Pittsburgh, attended a meeting of the Cursillo movement in August 1966. They were introduced to two books, The Cross and the Switchblade and They Speak with Other Tongues, which emphasized the Holy Spirit and the Spirit's charisms.

In February 1967, Storey and Keifer attended an Episcopalian prayer meeting and were baptized in the Holy Spirit. The following week, Keifer laid hands on other Duquesne professors, and they also had an experience with the Spirit. Then, in February, during a gathering of Duquesne University students at The Ark and The Dove Retreat Center north of Pittsburgh, more people asked Keifer to pray over them. This led to the event at the chapel where they too received the Holy Spirit and spoke in tongues, as well as many other students who were present in the chapel. Keifer sent the news of this event to the University of Notre Dame, where a similar event later occurred, and the Renewal began to spread.

While the Catholic hierarchy was initially reticent about these developments, Pope Paul VI officially welcomed Catholic charismatics in 1975.

Expansion 
Adherents of the movement formed prayer groups and covenant communities. In these communities, members practiced a stronger commitment to spiritual ideals and created documents, or covenants, that set up rules of life. One of the first structured covenant communities was the Word of God (1970) in Ann Arbor, Michigan and True House (1971) and the People of Praise (1971) in South Bend, Indiana.  In 1982 a "community of communities" was formed called the Sword of the Spirit. A schism would eventually occur within the Word of God, where one of its founders remained president of the Sword of the Spirit and another founder stayed with the Word of God and founded the Catholic Fraternity of Charismatic Covenant Communities and Fellowships in 1990. Whereas the Sword of the Spirit is an ecumenical organization, the Catholic Fraternity is only for Catholic communities.

To facilitate communication between different expressions of charismatic renewal which were developing in the Catholic Church worldwide, in 1972 the first International Communications Office (ICO) was established in Ann Arbor, Then in 1976 it was transferred to Malines-Brussels (Belgium), the diocese of Cardinal Suenens; he changed it to the International Catholic Charismatic Renewal Office (ICCRO) in 1978; this office transferred to Rome in 1981 and to the Vatican in 1985. In 1993 it was granted pontifical recognition and became International Catholic Charismatic Renewal Service (ICCRS), to emphasise its role as a pastoral ministry service to Catholic charismatic renewal worldwide.

In addition to the covenant communities and international offices, the Catholic charismatic renewal also experienced international development due to missionary priests who experienced the baptism of the Holy Spirit while visiting the United States and implemented their own such services when they returned home. The earliest international growth of Catholic charismatic renewal could be found in England from 1969 and in the early 1970s, amongst Catholics in Australia, India, Brazil, and Nigeria. The International Catholic Charismatic Renewal Services has had a significant role in the guidance of this form of expansion.

Today

As of 2013, the Catholic charismatic renewal had over 160 million members. Participants in the Renewal also cooperate with non-Catholic ecclesiastical communities and other Catholics for ecumenism, as encouraged by Vatican II.

The charismatic element of the Church is seen as being evident today as it was in the early days of Christianity. Some Catholic charismatic communities conduct healing services, gospel power services, outreaches and evangelizations where the presence of the Holy Spirit is believed to be felt, and healings and miracles are said to take place. The mission of the Catholic charismatic renewal is to educate believers into the totality of the declaration of the gospels. This is done by a personal relationship with Jesus Christ; a one-to-one relationship with Jesus is seen as a possibility by the Charismatic. Conscience is seen as an alternative voice of Jesus Christ.

CCR Golden Jubilee 2017
In response to the invitation of Pope Francis, ICCRS and Catholic Fraternity organised together the Catholic charismatic renewal golden jubilee in 2017. The event began on May 31 and celebrations continued until Pentecost Mass on June 4.

Ecumenical implications
Given that the charismatic movement has spread across numerous Christian denominations, it carries implications with respect to advancing ecumenism. As the charismatic movement spread among Catholics, speakers from other Christian denominations have been invited to lecture at Catholic conferences. Leo Joseph Suenens, a Cardinal in the Catholic Church, led a study of Catholic charismatic renewal; its conclusion stated that "It is evident that the charismatic renewal is a major ecumenical force and is de facto ecumenical in nature." Ecumenical covenant communities arose within the Catholic charismatic movement with members from major Christian denominations (Catholic, Lutheran, Anglican, Reformed, etc.); notable examples include Word of God and People of Praise. Theologians Peter Hocken, Tony Richie and Christopher A. Stephenson have written that these covenant communities demonstrate that "A shared life based on baptism in the Holy Spirit could and should be lived ecumenically."

Baptism in the Holy Spirit 
A central concept in charismatic renewal is the experience of the "baptism in the Holy Spirit" (or "baptism with the Holy Spirit" or  the "infilling of the Holy Spirit"). This refers to an individual receiving a personal experience of the power of God, as the Apostles did at Pentecost; and as believers did in the early Church when they were baptised and received prayer with laying on of hands, or simply hearing the good news of salvation. Catholic theologians McDonell and Montague conclude, from their study of the Bible and ancient Christian authors, that "the baptism in the Spirit is integral to Christian initiation." They go on to say that "baptism in the Spirit is not special grace for some but common grace for all."

Traditional Catholics consider that the Sacrament of Baptism is sufficient in itself. However, Fr Raniero Cantalamessa, preacher to the Papal household, explains that "Catholic theology recognizes the concept of a valid but tied sacrament. A sacrament is called tied if the fruit that should accompany it remains bound because of certain blocks that prevent its effectiveness." He goes on to say that sacraments are not magical rituals that act mechanically, without the person's knowledge or response. The individual's personal response and faith is needed in order for the grace and power of the sacraments to flow into their life.

Reaction

From the Church hierarchy

The initial reaction to the movement by the Church hierarchy was cautiously supportive. Some initially supported it as being a harbinger of ecumenism (greater unity of Gospel witness among the different Christian traditions). It was thought that these practices would draw the Catholic Church and Protestant communities closer together in a truly spiritual ecumenism. Today, the Catholic Charismatic Renewal enjoys support from most of the Church's hierarchy, from the Pope to bishops of dioceses around the world, as a recognized ecclesial movement.

Four popes have acknowledged the movement: Pope Paul VI, Pope John Paul II, Benedict XVI, and Pope Francis.  Pope Paul VI acknowledged the movement in 1971 and reaffirmed it in 1975. He went on to say that the movement brought vitality and joy to the Church but also mentioned for people to be discerning of the spirits. Pope John Paul II was also supportive of the Renewal and was in favor of its conservative politics. He (as well as then-Cardinal Ratzinger, Pope Emeritus Benedict XVI) acknowledged good aspects of the movement while urging caution, pointing out that members must maintain their Catholic identity and communion with the Catholic Church.

Pope John Paul II, in particular, made a number of statements on the movement.  On November 30, 1990, The Pontifical Council for the Laity promulgated the decree which inaugurated the Catholic Fraternity of Charismatic Covenant Communities and Fellowships. Brian Smith of Brisbane, elected President of the Executive of the Fraternity, called the declaration the most significant event in the history of the charismatic renewal since the 1975 Holy Year international conference and the acknowledgment it received from Pope Paul VI at that time, saying: "It is the first time that the Renewal has had formal, canonical recognition by the Vatican."

In March 1992, Pope John Paul II stated At this moment in the Church's history, the Charismatic Renewal can play a significant role in promoting the much-needed defense of Christian life in societies where secularism and materialism have weakened many people's ability to respond to the Spirit and to discern God's loving call. Your contribution to the re-evangelization of society will be made in the first place by personal witness to the indwelling Spirit and by showing forth His presence through works of holiness and solidarity.
Moreover, during Pentecost 1998, the Pope recognized the essential nature of the charismatic dimension:

"The institutional and charismatic aspects are co-essential as it were to the Church’s constitution. They contribute, although differently, to the life, renewal and sanctification of God’s People. It is from this providential rediscovery of the Church’s charismatic dimension that, before and after the Council, a remarkable pattern of growth has been established for ecclesial movements and new communities."

The Papal Preacher, Rev. Fr. Raniero Cantalamessa, has written on the topic numerous times since 1986.

Pope Francis has spoken encouragingly about charismatic renewal on many occasions. In June 2014 he said: "You, Charismatic Renewal, have received a great gift from the Lord.  You were born of the will of the Spirit as a current of grace in the Church and for the Church." On June 8, 2019 he encouraged everyone in Charismatic Renewal "to share baptism in the Holy Spirit with everyone in the Church."

Formation of CHARIS 
On June 6, 2019, the CHARIS ("Catholic Charismatic Renewal International Service") service was officially inaugurated. On that day, the activities of the International Catholic Charismatic Renewal Services and the Catholic Fraternity, the two international organizations recognized by the Holy See that have provided the Renewal service worldwide so far, have ceased. 

The CHARIS service is subordinate to the Dicastery for the Laity, Family and Life. The purpose of CHARIS is to promote and strengthen communion among all expressions of Catholic Charismatic Renewal, as well as promoting and working for unity among all Christians, CHARIS has a "public juridic personality" within the Roman Catholic Church and has come into being as a direct initiative of the highest ecclesiastical authority, Pope Francis. 

The primary objectives of CHARIS are "To help deepen and promote the grace of baptism in the Holy Spirit throughout the Church and to promote the exercise of charisms not only in Catholic Charismatic Renewal but also in the whole Church."

Criticism
Charismatic Catholics and their practices have been criticized for distracting Catholics from authentic Church teachings and traditions, especially by making the worship experience more akin to Pentecostal Protestantism. According to Samuel Rodriguez, Charismatic services in America simply help in increasing the number of Catholics converting to Pentecostal and evangelical denominations: “If you are involved in a Charismatic service today, in ten years’ time—inevitably—you are going to end up in one of my churches.” In particular, some traditionalists criticize charismatic Catholics as being crypto-Protestant.

Critics of the charismatic movement argue that practices such as faith healing draw attention away from the Mass and the communion with Christ that takes place therein.

Others criticize the movement for removing or obscuring traditional Catholic symbols (such as the crucifix and Sacred Heart) in favor of more contemporary expressions of faith.

The belief that extraordinary spiritual gifts no longer operate in ordinary circumstances is called Cessationism.

See also

Charismatic movement
Catholic charismatic renewal in Latin America
Community of the Chemin Neuf
Divine Retreat Centre, Muringoor
Emmanuel Community
Frank Hammond
Jesus Youth
Pentecostalism
Prayer meeting

References

Further reading

 Wilson Ewin ([199-]). The Spirit of Pentecostal-Charismatic Unity. Nashua, N.H.: Bible Baptist Church. N.B.: Discussion of the charismatic movement's Catholic and non-Catholic increase in coöperation and at attempts for unity. Without ISBN
 

 
 
 
 
 
 Includes practical applications of Catholic teaching on discernment of spirits by a prominent charismatic leader in higher education.
 
  This book is available for free at the John Carroll University website (see external link below).
 Cardinal L.J. Suenens, Une Novelle Pentecôte? [s.l.]: Desclée de Brouwer, 1974. Sans ISBN

External links
Dr. Peter Kreeft discusses the philosophy of the charisms (visions, tongues, healing, etc.), feat. Dave Nevins
Catholic Charismatic Renewal in England
Catholic Charismatic Renewal International Service (CHARIS)
International Catholic Charismatic Renewal Services (ICCRS)
Address of Pope John Paul II to the ICCRO Council
Writings of Léon Joseph Cardinal Suenens
Renewal Ministries, founded by Ralph Martin
"A Neuroscientific Look at Speaking in Tongues," New York Times, Nov. 7, 2006
A 10-Country Survey of the Charisms
 LaVergne, Colin "Why Did God Start the Catholic Charismatic Renewal?"  March, 2009
Seminary Rector Fr. William Baer on the Charismatic Renewal, April, 2008, audio file

Charismatic and Pentecostal Christianity
Catholic lay organisations
Catholic spirituality
Christian revivals
1967 establishments in Pennsylvania